Alan Dillon (born 28 September 1982) is an Irish Fine Gael politician who has been a Teachta Dála (TD) for the Mayo constituency since the 2020 general election.

Prior to entering politics, he was a two-time All Star winning Gaelic footballer who captained the senior Mayo county team.

Personal life
He is married to Ashling Dillon, and they have two sons. Dillon attended Davitt College in Castlebar for his Secondary school education. He studied at NUI Galway, and played for the university football team. Dillon has a MSc in Pharmaceutical Science from the Royal College of Surgeons Ireland, a Postgraduate Diploma in Education from NUI Galway, and a BSc in Applied Mathematics and Biology from Maynooth University.  Dillon has also participated in a marketing campaign for Ireland West Airport Knock.

Gaelic football career
Alan played football with his local club Ballintubber in County Mayo and was a pivotal member of the senior Mayo county team from 2003 until his retirement in 2017, playing in six All-Ireland finals. His fine-tuned skill, his sharp roving eye and his clever reading of the game all contribute to his exceptional footballing abilities. Dillon won his first All Star award in 2006 and a second All Star award in 2012.

On 28 November 2017, Dillon announced his retirement from inter-county football.

Political career
Following his retirement from inter-county football in 2017, there was much speculation that Dillon would replace former Taoiseach Enda Kenny as a Fine Gael candidate for Mayo. 

He has numerous links to Fine Gael, an aunt having been Enda Kenny's Castlebar secretary and her husband being Kenny's driver and a county councillor. In 2020, he successfully stood as a Fine Gael candidate for the 2020 general election in the Mayo constituency. In July 2020, Dillon was elected as the secretary of the Fine Gael parliamentary party, following its AGM in the Convention Centre Dublin.

References

External links

Alan Dillon's page on Fine Gael website

1982 births
Living people
Alumni of the University of Galway
Alumni of Maynooth University
Alumni of the Royal College of Surgeons in Ireland
Ballintubber Gaelic footballers
Fine Gael TDs
Gaelic football forwards
Irish sportsperson-politicians
Mayo inter-county Gaelic footballers
Members of the 33rd Dáil
University of Galway Gaelic footballers
People from Castlebar
Politicians from County Mayo